Walter Stokvis was a British film editor of the 1930s, working mainly at the Elstree Studios of British International Pictures.

Selected filmography
 Suspense (1930)
 The Flying Fool (1931)
 The Woman Between (1931)
 Strip! Strip! Hooray!!! (1932)
 The Indiscretions of Eve (1932)
 Arms and the Man (1932)
 Sleepless Nights (1932)
 Their Night Out (1933)
 The Scotland Yard Mystery (1934)
 My Song Goes Round the World (1934)
 The Student's Romance (1935)
 Abdul the Damned (1935)
 The Marriage of Corbal (1936)
 Dishonour Bright (1936)
 Pagliacci (1936)
 Luck of the Navy (1938)
 Yes, Madam? (1939)

References

Bibliography
 Brown, Geoff. Launder and Gilliat. British Film Institute, 1977.

External links

Year of birth unknown
Year of death unknown
British film editors